Marlene Schönberger (born 6 December 1990) is a German politician of Alliance 90/The Greens who has been serving as a member of the Bundestag since the 2021 German federal election.

Education
Schönberger holds a master's degree in political science from Ludwig Maximilian University of Munich. Following her graduation in 2016, she worked as research assistant at the State Parliament of Bavaria (2018) and at Ludwig Maximilian University (2018–2021).

Political career
Schönberger joined the Green Party in 2010.

In parliament, Schönberger has been serving on the Committee on Education and Research.

Other activities
 Federal Agency for Civic Education (BPB), Member of the Board of Trustees (since 2022)
 Education and Science Workers' Union (GEW), Member

Personal life
In Berlin, Schönberger shares an apartment with fellow parliamentarians Emilia Fester and Saskia Weishaupt.

References

External links 
 

Living people
1990 births
People from Landshut
21st-century German politicians
21st-century German women politicians
Members of the Bundestag for Alliance 90/The Greens
Members of the Bundestag 2021–2025
Female members of the Bundestag

LGBT members of the Bundestag
German LGBT politicians
Lesbian politicians